The Presbyterian Church in Korea (ChongHoe II.) is a Reformed Presbyterian Church in South Korea. It subscribes the Apostles Creed and Westminster Confession. In 2004 the church had 30,186 members in 123 congregations and 132 ordained ministers.

References 

Presbyterian denominations in South Korea
Presbyterian denominations in Asia